Kou Lei (born November 20, 1987 in Beijing) is a Ukrainian table tennis player of Chinese origin.

Career
As of April 2017, Kou is ranked no. 20 in the world by the International Table Tennis Federation (ITTF). Kou is also right-handed, and uses the offensive, shakehand grip.

Kou represented his adopted nation Ukraine at the 2008 Summer Olympics in Beijing, where he competed in the men's singles. He lost the preliminary round match to Congo's Suraju Saka, with a set score of 1–4.

References

External links
 
 NBC 2008 Olympics profile
 Kou Lei Profile - Table Tennis Guide

1987 births
Living people
Olympic table tennis players of Ukraine
Ukrainian male table tennis players
Chinese male table tennis players
Table tennis players at the 2008 Summer Olympics
Table tennis players at the 2016 Summer Olympics
Table tennis players from Beijing
Naturalized citizens of Ukraine
Ukrainian people of Chinese descent
Table tennis players at the 2015 European Games
Table tennis players at the 2019 European Games
European Games medalists in table tennis
European Games bronze medalists for Ukraine
Naturalised table tennis players
Chinese emigrants to Ukraine
Table tennis players at the 2020 Summer Olympics